Arlington Capital Partners is a Washington, DC based private equity firm focusing on leveraged buyout and recapitalization investments in middle market companies. Started in 1999, the firm manages $7.0 billion of committed capital out of five investment funds.

Arlington Capital Partners invests in the aerospace, defense, government services & technology, healthcare services, business services, and software.

History
The firm was co-founded in 1999 by Raymond W. Smith, Paul G. Stern, Jeffrey H. Freed and Robert I. Knibb. Its first fund closed in 2000 after raising $450 million. The second fund closed in 2006 with $575 million raised, their third fund closed in 2011 with $415.5 million, their fourth fund closed in 2016 with $700 million, and their fifth fund closed in 2019 with $1.7 billion raised.

Notable investments
Notable investments have included:

Avalign Technologies
Advanced Health
AdVenture Interactive
AEgis
Apogen Technologies
Cadence Aerospace
Cambridge Major Laboratories
Centauri
Chandler May
Compusearch Software Solutions
Consolidated Precision Products
The Daily Racing Form
Endeavor Robotics
Grand River Aseptic Manufacturing
iRobot Defense Holdings, Inc.
MB Aerospace
Micron Technologies
Micropact
NLX Corporation
Novetta Solutions
Ontario Systems
Octo Consulting
Quantum Spatial
Polaris Alpha
Secor
Signal Tree
Stellant Systems
Tex Tech
TSI
Tyto Athene
Virgo Holdings
Zemax

References

Private equity firms based in Washington, D.C.